"Two Lives" is a song by British recording artist Example. This is the fifth single from Example's second album, Won't Go Quietly. The song was released on 14 November 2010.

The song failed to chart in the UK top 40 as it only achieved a position of 84. But on the other hand, it achieved 6 in the UK Indie Chart and 10 on the UK Dance Chart.

Music video
A music video to accompany the release of "Two Lives" was first released onto YouTube on 14 October 2010 at a total length of three minutes and thirty-three seconds.

Track listing

Chart performance

Release history

References 

2010 singles
2010 songs
Example (musician) songs
Songs written by Amir Amor
Songs written by Example (musician)
Songs written by Eshraque "iSHi" Mughal
Songs written by Pontus Hjelm
Ministry of Sound singles
Eurodance songs